Thomas Rytter Jakobsen (born 6 January 1974) is a retired Danish footballer and manager, who played as a right-back. He is currently the manager of Blovstrød IF.

In 2001, he won the Danish Superliga championship with F.C. Copenhagen, and most prominently played for Spanish club Sevilla and German club Wolfsburg. Rytter was named 1994 Danish under-21 Talent of the Year, and he played four matches for the Danish national team between 1996 and 2003.

Career

Early career 
Born in Copenhagen, Rytter started his career at Lyngby Boldklub. He made his senior debut for the club in 1992, 18 years old, and immediately secured himself a place in the Lyngby first team squad. Rytter was one of several promising young Lyngby players, including later Danish internationals Dennis Rommedahl and Niclas Jensen, and he was called up for the Danish under-19 national team in October 1992. He went on to play 22 matches for the Danish under-21 national team from 1993 to 1996, and won the 1994 Danish under-21 Talent of the Year award.

Sevilla 
Rytter was called up for Danish national team coach Bo Johansson's debut game, and got his international debut in the 1–0 win against Sweden on 14 August 1996. After five seasons at Lyngby, Rytter left the club in the winter 1996. He was sold by Lyngby CEO Flemming Østergaard to Spanish club Sevilla FC in the La Liga championship. Rytter made his debut for Sevilla in December 1996. In his first year at the club, Sevilla were relegated to the Segunda División. Rytter played the first half of the next season for Sevilla, before moving back to Denmark in January 1998.

Return to Denmark 
Bought by F.C. Copenhagen (FCK) CEO Flemming Østergaard, Rytter made his FCK debut in March 1998. At FCK, he was reunited with former Lyngby teammate Niclas Jensen, and the two formed a wingback duo that was known as the best in the Superliga. Rytter was a part of the FCK team which won the 2001 Superliga trophy, and was once again called up for the Danish national team, by new national coach Morten Olsen. He played his second national team game in November 2001.

Wolfsburg 
His contract with FCK was set to run out in the summer 2002, and in the winter 2001, Rytter and FCK failed to agree on a contract extension. He was initially benched, but was eventually sold to Bundesliga club VfL Wolfsburg in December 2001.

Retirement at Brøndby 
He played three and a half seasons at Wolfsburg, and was twice called up for the Danish national team by Morten Olsen. In July 2005, he moved back to Denmark to Brøndby IF, the main rivals of his former club FCK. This caused controversy in FCK, where Flemming Østergaard concluded that all footballers are egoists as Thomas was like a son to him. Thomas Rytter replied "I already have a father, and his name is Frank". In his first season at Brøndby, injuries reduced his playing time. On 25 August 2008 he retired from professional football.

Honours
 1994 Danish under-21 Talent of the Year
 2001 Danish Superliga, with F.C. Copenhagen
 2008 Danish Cup, with Brøndby IF

References

External links
 Danish national team profile 
 Brøndby IF profile 
 Career statistics by Danmarks Radio 
 

1974 births
Living people
Danish men's footballers
Lyngby Boldklub players
F.C. Copenhagen players
Brøndby IF players
La Liga players
Sevilla FC players
Bundesliga players
VfL Wolfsburg players
Denmark international footballers
Denmark under-21 international footballers
Expatriate footballers in Germany
Expatriate footballers in Spain
Danish expatriate sportspeople in Germany
Danish expatriate sportspeople in Spain
Association football defenders
Footballers from Copenhagen